The Hlukhiv Regiment was one the territorial-administrative subdivisions of the Cossack Hetmanate. The regiment's capital was the city of Hlukhiv, now in Sumy Oblast of northeastern Ukraine.

The Hlukhiv Regiment was founded in 1663 by hetman Ivan Briukhovetsky. It was formed from sotnias of Nizhyn Regiment located on different bank of Seym river.

After its abolishment in 1665, all of the sotnias went back to Nizhyn Regiment.

Structure
The regiment comprised 6 sotnias:
 Voronizh
 Hlukhiv
 Korop
 Krolevets
 Novi Mlyny
 Yampil

Commanders
All commanders were Colonels.
Kyrylo Hulianytskyi 1663-1664
Vasyl Cherkashchenytsia 1664-1665

References

Sources 

Cossack Hetmanate Regiments
History of Sumy Oblast